Shamil Abdurrahim oglu Azizbayov (1906–1976) was an Azerbaijani geologist specializing in petrology and metallogeny. He was one of
the founders (1945) and a vice-president of the Azerbaijan National Academy of Sciences.

 Chairman of the Department of Geology, chemistry sciences and oil (1945–1947). 
 Member of Presidium and academic Secretary of the Department of Earth Sciences of (1959–1976).
 Head of the Department of Crystallography, Mineralogy and Petrography of the Azerbaijan Industrial Institute (1945–1959).
 One of the founders of geology and petrography school in Azerbaijan.
 Honored scientist of Azerbaijan Republic (1960).

References

1906 births
1976 deaths
People from Baku Governorate
Scientists from Baku
Recipients of the Order of the Red Star
Recipients of the Order of the Red Banner of Labour
Azerbaijani geologists
Soviet geologists
Soviet metallurgists
Burials at Alley of Honor